Carignan/Rivère l'Acadie Water Aerodrome  is an aerodrome located near Carignan, Quebec, Canada.

References

Registered aerodromes in Montérégie
Seaplane bases in Quebec
La Vallée-du-Richelieu Regional County Municipality